Prince Frederick William Henry Augustus of Prussia (19 September 1779 – 19 July 1843) was a Prussian royal and general. Born on Friedrichsfelde Palace, he was the youngest son of Prince Augustus Ferdinand of Prussia, the brother of King Frederick the Great, and Margravine Elisabeth Louise of Brandenburg-Schwedt.

Military career
August joined the Prussian army as a young man, earning the rank of captain by eighteen years old. In 1803, he became a major and was granted an infantry battalion of his own. Three years later, now a lieutenant colonel, he and his battalion took part in the Battle of Auerstedt. His brother, Prince Louis Ferdinand, had been killed by the French army under Napoleon I four days earlier. August himself was captured and held by the French until 1807.

In March 1808, his cousin, King Frederick William III of Prussia, made him brigadier general. The Prince spent the next five years reorganizing the Prussian artillery together with Gerhard von Scharnhorst. Seven years after the failure of the Prussian army at Auerstedt, the Prince distinguished himself at the Battle of Leipzig. He continued his campaign against Napoleon throughout 1814. In the winter 1814-1815, August attended the Congress of Vienna. He moved to the north of France in June 1818 and then back to Berlin after the war had ended.

He spent his last years inspecting artillery units in various garrison towns. He died suddenly in Bromberg during one such trip,  and was buried in Berlin Cathedral in a service accompanied by the Staats- und Dom Choir Berlin.

Relationships and estate 
Although he was one of the richest landowners in Prussia, his estates reverted to the Crown upon his death, since he never left any legitimate heirs. His first mistress, Karoline Friederike Wichmann, with whom he cohabited from 1805 until 1817, bore him four children. She was ennobled as Baroness von Waldenburg. His second mistress was Auguste Arend, later ennobled as Baroness von Prillwitz. They were together from 1818 until her death in 1834, and had seven children. Shortly after Baroness Von Prillwitz's death he began a relationship with and morganatically married Emilie von Ostrowska, a Polish noblewoman. They had a daughter, Charlotte, who was five when her father died, and was raised by her father's Jewish tailor.

Honours 
He received the following orders and decorations:

Ancestry

References

Prussian princes
Coppet group
Generals of Infantry (Prussia)
Prussian commanders of the Napoleonic Wars
1779 births
1843 deaths
Recipients of the Iron Cross (1813)
Knights Cross of the Military Order of Maria Theresa
Grand Crosses of the Order of Saint Stephen of Hungary
Recipients of the Order of St. George of the Second Degree
Recipients of the Order of St. Anna, 1st class
Recipients of the Order of St. Vladimir, 2nd class
Burials at Berlin Cathedral
Military personnel from Berlin
People from Lichtenberg